Desmond Alexander Cullum-Jones (1 December 1924 – 6 June 2002) was an American born, British actor known for films such as Impact (1963), Dad's Army (1971), Freak Out (2004) and Wednesday's Child (1962). On the TV show Dad's Army he played Private Desmond.

Cullum-Jones also appeared in TV shows such as Suspense, Sherlock Holmes, Dixon of Dock Green, Softly, Softly, Crime of Passion, Nancy Astor, Father Dear Father, Z-Cars, The Good Life and The Bill. He also appeared in the Doctor Who story "The War Machines".
In 1977, Cullum-Jones went into semi-retirement only playing small onscreen parts.

References

External links

1924 births
2002 deaths
British male film actors
British male television actors
Male actors from Seattle
American emigrants to England